Sree Narayana College (SN College) is an educational institution situated in Varkala, municipality of Trivandrum, in the state of Kerala, India. The college is located on a small hilltop with a campus encompassing hundreds of acres in Sreenivasapuram area of Varkala municipality. The college is affiliated with Kerala University.

The alumni association ASNCOS (Association of Sree Narayana College Old Students) has chapters in different countries.

General information

The college is affiliated with the University of Kerala, headquartered in Trivandrum and currently offers 11 undergraduate and five postgraduate courses, with eight departments as approved research centers. SN College has earned a reputation as a leader in the field of co-curricular and extension activities.

Other facilities and amenities available on campus include a Study Centre of the University of Kerala that caters to the teachers, students, and research scholars of Varkala, a University Career Guidance and Information Center, a Study Center of the Indira Gandhi National Open University offering distance education courses, units of National Service Scheme and NCC, and a computer center. The college has a staff of more than 270, including 190 members of the teaching faculty. Among the former principals who presided over this institution, Dr. Mohan Sreekumar was at the helm of the college for 20 years.

History

The college was inaugurated on 7 July 1964, by Sri. R. Sankar, then Chief Minister of Kerala and an ardent believer of the Principles and teachings of Sree Narayana Guru. In 1967, an official sanction for starting degree courses was obtained. On 24 July 1967, the degree courses were formally inaugurated. In 1981, the college started offering post graduate courses, first in Economics, followed by Physics (1995), then Analytical Chemistry (2001).
In 2006, the University of Kerala recognized the Post Graduate Department of Economics as a Research Centre in Economics. Now it offers various research programmes including Ph.D.he B+ grade conferred by the National Assessment and Accreditation Council (NAAC) in 2003-2004.

Departments 

 Physics
 Chemistry
 Mathematics
 Geology
 Zoology
 Botany
 Economics
 History
 Malayalam
 Physical Education
 bcom
 bcom with Hotel Management

Courses 
SN College, Varkala, offers 11 degree courses and 5 post-graduate courses. The Departments of Zoology, Chemistry and Physics are recognized research centres. It also offers facilities for an Indira Gandhi National Open University (IGNOU) centre and an International Development Enterprises (IDE) centre.

Degree courses 

 BSc Physics
 BSc Chemistry 
 BSc Mathematics
 BSc Geology
 BSc Zoology
 BSc Botany
 BA Economics
 BA History
 BA Malayalam
 BCom
 BCom with Hotel Management

Post Graduate Courses 

 MSc Physics
 MSc Chemistry
 MSc Geology
 MA Economics

Track record 

 Re-accreditation by NAAC with 'A' grade
 The College has been short listed by the UGC for the autonomous status
 IPR status has been submitted to the University
 Dept of Physics has 3 patents, 2 International and 1 National.

Student life 

Debates, music, dance, sports, games, social work, and other cultural programmes are available at Mar Ivanios campus.

Alumni association: ASNCOS

The alumni association ASNCOS aims at establishing and maintaining close contact and friendship with all those who leave the college after their studies. Old students are enrolled as members and are informed of college activities, progress and achievements. They are invited to an annual get-together at the college. The executive committee elected annually is responsible for the functioning of the association.

ASNCOS also has an auxiliary known as ASNFOM (ASNCOS Friends of Music), with the objective of promoting the musical talents of former and present students of SN College, Varkala.

Notable alumni
G. Karthikeyan
Renganaath Ravee
Raj Kalesh
Vindhuja Vikraman

See also

 List of colleges affiliated to Kerala University
 List of universities in India
 Distance Education Council
 University Grants Commission (India)
 National Assessment and Accreditation Council

References

External links 
http://sncsivagirivarkala.com/
https://web.archive.org/web/20060108161632/http://www.keralauniversity.edu/snckollam.htm

Colleges affiliated to the University of Kerala
Colleges in Thiruvananthapuram
Educational institutions established in 1964
1964 establishments in Kerala
Varkala